The following are the winners of the 6th annual (1979) Origins Award, presented at Origins 1980:

Charles Roberts Awards

The H.G. Wells Awards

Adventure Gaming Hall of Fame Inductee
 David Isby

External links
 1979 Origins Awards Winners

1979 awards
Origins Award winners
1979 awards in the United States